Trinseo is a company focusing particularly on the manufacture of plastics and latex binders. Trinseo (formerly known as Styron) was part of the Dow Chemical Company until Dow grouped several of its businesses for potential sale in 2009. In 2010, under the name Styron, those holdings were sold to private equity firm Bain Capital for $1.63 billion. As of 2016, Bain sold all of its stock in Trinseo, grossing $1.69 billion for 37,269,567 shares, resulting in Trinseo's  “full independence as a public company.”

The company offers a broad line of plastics and latex binders, which are used primarily in the automotive, appliances, electronics, packaging, paper & board, textiles and carpet industries, among others. Trinseo materials are used widely, in cars and trucks, home appliances, consumer goods, electronics, electrical & lighting, building & construction, medical supplies, and packaging.

As of March 4, 2019, Frank Bozich became the President and CEO, succeeding Christopher D. Pappas.

Company history
Trinseo's precursor Styron was formed in August 2009 when Dow Chemical Company combined several of its businesses--styrenics; polycarbonate and compounds & blends; Dow Automotive plastics; emulsion polymers (paper and carpet latex); and synthetic rubber — as part of a larger process of identifying and selling non-strategic assets.
Several private equity firms bid on Styron, including TPG Capital, Apollo Management, and Lotte Group. On March 2, 2010, Bain Capital announced that it would purchase the newly formed company for $1.63 billion, with Dow retaining a 7.5% stake. The sale was finalized in June 2010.

The name Trinseo was chosen in 2012. By February 2015, all legal entities worldwide had changed to the name Trinseo.

As of 2016, Bain sold all of its stock in Trinseo, grossing $1.69 billion for 37,269,567 shares, resulting in Trinseo's  “full independence as a public company.” In November 2017, Trinseo started a MAGNUM ABS production line manufacturing plant at the Zhangjiagang, China site.

Financial
Trinseo is headquartered in Wayne, Pennsylvania.
Trinseo comprises approximately 3,400 employees in North America, Europe and Asia Pacific. 

Styron was the #67 ranked chemical company globally in 2011, posting sales of $6.193B. 
As of 2013, Trinseo's annual revenue was approximately $5.54 billion. 
 the company reported a net income of $310 million and an adjusted EBITDA guidance of $580 million.

Trinseo owns a 50% stake in North American polystyrene producer American Styrenics LLC, a joint venture based in the Woodlands, Texas.
Trinseo previously held a 50% stake in Sumika Styron Polycarbonate Limited, but sold this to Sumitomo Chemical in 2017.
In 2016 Trinseo signed an agreement to sell its Brazil-based businesses to Qoppar Participacoes Ltda.

As of 2017, Trinseo announced its first acquisition, the Italian plastics firm Applicazioni Plastiche Industriali. API's softer plastics will complement Trinseo's harder plastics. On September 27, 2017, Trinseo  opened a new research and development center in Terneuzen, Netherlands.

New York Stock Exchange

All shares were sold in the offering, and raised over $190 million.

Products and applications

 The company produces polystyrene co-polymers (ABS, SAN)  and expanded polystyrene  primarily used in packaging, food applications and home appliances. 
 The company produces styrene butadiene latex, which is applied as a coating on coated paper. 
 The company produces functionalized solution styrene butadiene rubber (SSBR) for use in high performance tires, and opened a new 50,000 metric ton production unit for production of SSBR in Schkopau, Germany in late 2012. They also produces polycarbonate compounds and blends primarily used in automotive applications, medical devices and LED lighting.
 The company's LGF polypropylene resin was instrumental in Ford Motor Company's development of an innovative headlamp bracket, which was awarded a 2012 Society of Plastics Engineers Innovation for Safety Award. Their material solutions have also contributed to the design of the first, "thermoplastic lift-gate solution" in the new Renault Clio.

See also
 Materials science
 Rubber technology
 Styrene
 Polystyrene
 Plastic
 Latex

References

Rubber industry
Plastics
Companies listed on the New York Stock Exchange
Tax inversions